The Maribor Academic Choir is a choir based in Maribor in Slovenia. As of 2008 it is under the presidency of Tilen Žibret and conducted by Hungarian conductor Zsuzsa Budavari-Novak who has led the choir since 2002.

Founded in 1964 it began as a male student cultural association (KUD Študent) conducted by Stane Jurgec but following the establishment of the University of Maribor in 1975 the choir permitted both sexes.

Past conductors
Stane Jurgec
Simon Robinson 
Jože Fürst

References

External links
History at ://www.kudstudent.org

Slovenian choirs
Culture in Maribor
Musical groups established in 1964